Ceratoxancus basileus is a species of sea snail, a marine gastropod mollusk in the family Costellariidae.

Description

Distribution
This marine species occurs off New Caledonia.

References

 Kantor Yu.I., Bouchet Ph., 1997a. The anatomy and systematics of Ceratoxancus, a genus of deep-water Ptychatractinae (Gastropoda: Turbinellidae) with labral spine. Veliger, 40(2): 101-120.

Costellariidae
Gastropods described in 1997